Robert Peter Welsh (born 16 July 1943, in Dunedin, Otago) is a former 3000 meters steeplechase runner from New Zealand. In 1966 he competed for his native country at the Commonwealth Games in Kingston, Jamaica, winning the gold medal in the 3000m steeplechase event. He also competed at the 1968 Summer Olympics but was unfortunately  eliminated in the heats finishing 6th at Mexico City.

References
 sports-reference

1943 births
Living people
Athletes (track and field) at the 1968 Summer Olympics
Athletes (track and field) at the 1966 British Empire and Commonwealth Games
Olympic athletes of New Zealand
New Zealand male steeplechase runners
New Zealand male long-distance runners
Commonwealth Games gold medallists for New Zealand
Athletes from Dunedin
Commonwealth Games medallists in athletics
Medallists at the 1966 British Empire and Commonwealth Games